The Wise Guys is a Canadian crime drama film, directed by Jean-Claude Labrecque and released in 1972. Labrecque's first narrative feature film after a career making documentaries, the film centres on Pierre Drouin (Donald Pilon) and Réjean Cardinal (Daniel Pilon), two friends in the Gaspésie region of Quebec who become fugitives after refusing to leave their village when the provincial government orders it to be shut down.

The cast also includes Marcel Sabourin, Louise Laparé, Marcel Martel and Pierre Dagenais.

The film premiered in Quebec theatres on April 20, 1972. It was subsequently screened in the Directors' Fortnight stream at the 1972 Cannes Film Festival.

References

External links

1972 films
1972 crime drama films
Canadian crime drama films
Films directed by Jean-Claude Labrecque
1970s French-language films
French-language Canadian films
1970s Canadian films